In taxonomy, Methanohalobium is a genus of the Methanosarcinaceae. Its genome has been sequenced. The genus contains one species, M. evestigatum.

The species are strictly anaerobic and live solely through the production of methane through the reduction of carbon dioxide with hydrogen or using methyl compounds as substrates. These species are only somewhat halophilic but extremely thermophilic.

References

Further reading

Scientific journals

Scientific books

Scientific databases

External links

Methanohalobium at BacDive -  the Bacterial Diversity Metadatabase

Archaea genera
Euryarchaeota